Dean John-Wilson (born 6 June 1989) is a British actor. During 2008, he went on Britain's Got Talent, where he was a semi-finalist. He subsequently played the title role in the original West End production of Disney's Aladdin at the Prince Edward Theatre and has continued to appear in musicals.

Early life
John-Wilson was born in Middlesbrough. He used to pick his younger sister up from dance classes, and eventually decided to enroll in them as well. He studied tap, jazz, and gymnastics and did a BTEC in performing arts. Afterwards, he went to London's Mountview Academy of Theatre Arts.

Career
John-Wilson toured the UK with Sister Act and starred as Aquino in Here Lies Love at the National Theatre. He also has appeared in From Here To Eternity in the West End at the Shaftesbury Theatre. He starred in the title role in the original West End production of Disney's Aladdin at the Prince Edward Theatre. In 2016 John-Wilson starred in Miss Atomic Bomb opposite Catherine Tate at the St. James Theatre. The show received poor reviews, including a one star review from The Stage. In mid-2018, he played the role of Lun Tha in the West End revival of The King and I. In February 2020, he appeared in the ninth series of The Voice UK, and in March 2020, he portrayed the role of Mark Casey in an episode of the BBC soap opera Doctors.

References

External links

English male stage actors
Living people
1989 births
Actors from Yorkshire